Jan Wüstenfeld (born 26 June 1975) is a German biathlete. He competed in the men's 20 km individual event at the 1998 Winter Olympics.

References

External links
 

1975 births
Living people
German male biathletes
Olympic biathletes of Germany
Biathletes at the 1998 Winter Olympics
Sportspeople from Hanover
20th-century German people